ITA Software is a travel industry software division of Google, formerly an independent company, in Cambridge, Massachusetts. The company was founded by Jeremy Wertheimer, a computer scientist from the MIT Artificial Intelligence Laboratory and Cooper Union, with his partner Richard Aiken in 1996. On July 1, 2010, ITA agreed to be acquired by Google. On April 8, 2011, the US Department of Justice approved the buyout.  As part of the agreement, Google was required to license ITA software to other websites for five years.

History
ITA's first product was an airfare search and pricing system called QPX. This system has been and is used by travel companies such as Bing Travel, CheapTickets, Kayak.com, and Orbitz, and by airlines such as Alitalia, American, ANA, Cape Air, Delta Air Lines, United Airlines, US Airways, and Virgin Atlantic. ITA also hosts its own airfare search website based on QPX, called "Matrix", although it is not possible to buy tickets from it.

ITA was known for using programming puzzles to attract and evaluate potential employees since 2001.  Some of these puzzles have appeared in ads on Boston's MBTA subway system. ITA is also one of the highest-profile companies to base their software on Common Lisp.

In January 2006, ITA received $100 million in venture capital money from a syndicate of five investment firms led by Battery Ventures, marking the largest investment in a software firm in New England in five years.

In September 2006, ITA announced a several million dollar deal with Air Canada to develop a new computer reservations system to power its reservations, inventory control, seat availability, check-in, and airport operations.
In August 2009, Air Canada announced that the project had been suspended.

In July 2010, Google announced the acquisition of ITA for $700 million in cash, subject to DOJ review and approval. On April 8, 2011, the US Dept. of Justice and Google reached an agreement in terms to allow the purchase and dismiss a potential antitrust lawsuit.

On March 1, 2012, Google and Cape Air announced that Cape Air had migrated to ITA Software's passenger service system (PSS). One year later, Google announced that it was discontinuing the PSS.

In 2013, Google started offering a simplified API to QPX called QPX Express; it was discontinued on April 10, 2018.

See also
 Google Flights 
 List of global distribution systems (computer reservation systems)

References

External links

1996 establishments in Massachusetts
Software companies based in Massachusetts
Travel and holiday companies of the United States
Airline tickets
Business software companies
Travel technology
Common Lisp (programming language) software
Companies based in Cambridge, Massachusetts
Google acquisitions
American companies established in 1996
Hospitality companies established in 1996
Software companies established in 1996
2011 mergers and acquisitions
Software companies of the United States